KJOL (620 AM) is a radio station broadcasting a Christian format. Licensed to Grand Junction, Colorado, United States, the station serves the Grand Junction area. The station is owned by United Ministries.

History

KJOL was first licensed, as KSTR, to the Mountain States Broadcasting Company in Grand Junction, for 5,000 watts daytime-only on 620 kHz. The station changed its call sign to KKTK on March 1, 1994, to KKGM on October 12, 1994, and to KBZS on September 2, 1996.

Expanded Band assignment

On March 17, 1997, the Federal Communications Commission (FCC) announced that eighty-eight stations had been given permission to move to newly available "Expanded Band" transmitting frequencies, ranging from 1610 to 1700 kHz, with KBZS authorized to move from 620 to 1680 kHz. However, the station never procured the Construction Permit needed to implement the authorization, so the expanded band station was never built.

Later history

On January 30, 1998, the station became KKGM for a second time, and later call changes included KKGJ on August 14, 1998, KSTR for a second time on December 4, 1998, KRDY on March 15, 1999, KSTR for a third time on August 7, 2000, and KJOL on April 23, 2001.

Translators
KJOL is also heard on KJYE AM 1400 in Delta, Colorado and KJOL-FM 91.9 in Montrose, Colorado, as well as translators on 99.5 FM in Grand Junction, Colorado and on 91.3 FM in Paonia & Hotchkiss, Colorado.

References

External links

 FCC History Cards (covering 1956-1981 as KSTR)

JOL
Contemporary Christian radio stations in the United States
Grand Junction, Colorado
Moody Radio affiliate stations
Radio stations established in 1957
1957 establishments in Colorado